The Roman Catholic Diocese of Melipilla is a diocese located in the city of Melipilla in the Ecclesiastical province of Santiago de Chile in Chile.

History
 4 April 1991: Established as Diocese of Melipilla from the Metropolitan Archdiocese of Santiago de Chile

Bishops
 Bishops of Melipilla (Latin Church), in reverse chronological order
 Bishop Cristián Contreras Villarroel (2014.03.07 – present) 
 Bishop Enrique Troncoso Troncoso (2000.05.28 – 2014.03.07)
 Bishop Pablo Lizama Riquelme (1991.04.04 – 1999.01.04), appointed Bishop of Chile, Military; future Archbishop

Other priest of this diocese who became bishop
Guillermo Patricio Vera Soto, appointed Prelate of Calama in 2003

Sources
 GCatholic.org
 Catholic Hierarchy
 Diocese website

Roman Catholic dioceses in Chile
Christian organizations established in 1991
Roman Catholic dioceses and prelatures established in the 20th century
Melipilla, Roman Catholic Diocese of
1991 establishments in Chile